In mathematics, a polymatroid is a polytope associated with a submodular function. The notion was introduced by Jack Edmonds in 1970. It is also described as the multiset analogue of the matroid.

Definition
Let  be a finite set and  a non-decreasing submodular function, that is, for each  we have , and for each  we have .

.

An equivalent definition 
 We have that if , then  for every :

Relation to matroids
To every matroid  on the ground set  we can associate the set , where for every  we have that

Relation to generalized permutahedra
Because generalized permutahedra can be constructed from submodular functions, and  every generalized permutahedron has an associated submodular function, we have that there should be a correspondence between generalized permutahedra and polymatroids. In fact every polymatroid is a generalized permutahedron that has been translated to have a vertex in the origin. This result suggests that the combinatorial information of polymatroids is shared with generalized permutahedra.

Properties
 is nonempty if and only if  and that  is nonempty if and only if .

Contrapolymatroids
For a supermodular f one analogously may define the contrapolymatroid

This analogously generalizes the dominant of the spanning set polytope of matroids.

Discrete polymatroids 
When we only focus on the lattice points of our polymatroids we get what is called, discrete polymatroids. This combinatorial object is of great interest because of their relationship to monomial ideals.

References
Footnotes

Additional reading

Matroid theory